Glenridge Elementary School may refer to:
 Glenridge Elementary School - Clayton, Missouri (St. Louis area) - School District of Clayton
 Glenridge Elementary School - Woodlawn, Prince George's County, Maryland (Washington, DC area) - Prince George's County Public Schools
 Glenridge Elementary School - Kent, Washington - Kent School District